Juqan-e Bozorg (also Romanized as Jūqān-e Bozorg; also known as Jūghān-e Bozorg) is a village in Ujan-e Gharbi Rural District, in the Central District of Bostanabad County, East Azerbaijan Province, Iran. At the 2006 census, its population was 793, in 112 families.

References 

Populated places in Bostanabad County